Mad Bomber in Love is a 1992 Australian film. It was a slasher parody. Director James Bogle said of the film:
That was more like an event than a film, just to make the statement that, if you really wanted to, you could actually make a film for nothing. It took about a year to complete, as it turned out, even though we only shot it for 14 days.

References

External links

Australian slasher films
1992 films
1990s parody films
1990s slasher films
1992 comedy films
1990s English-language films
Australian comedy horror films
1990s Australian films